In mathematics, vague sets are an extension of fuzzy sets.

In a fuzzy set, each object is assigned a single value in the interval [0,1] reflecting its grade of membership. This single value does not allow a separation of evidence for membership and evidence against membership.

Gau et al. proposed the notion of vague sets, where each object is characterized by two different membership functions: a true membership function and a false membership function.
This kind of reasoning is also called interval membership, as opposed to point membership in the context of fuzzy sets.

Mathematical definition
A vague set  is characterized by
 its true membership function 
 its false membership function 
 with 

This interval can be interpreted as an extension to the fuzzy membership function. The vague set degenerates to a fuzzy set, if  for all x.

See also
Fuzzy set
Fuzzy concept

References

External links
 Vague Sets

Fuzzy logic
Systems of set theory